The MV Chilembwe is a passenger ship operating on Lake Malawi, named after Malawian freedom fighter John Chilembwe. It was launched in 2014 to partly replace the over 60 years old MV Ilala.

References

Ferries
Lake Malawi
Transport in Malawi
Ships of Malawi